Frank Wilson Warner III (born March 2 1938 in Pittsfield, Massachusetts) is an American mathematician, specializing in differential geometry.

Education and career
Warner graduated in 1959 with a bachelor's degree from Pennsylvania State University and in 1963 with a Ph.D. in mathematics from the Massachusetts Institute of Technology. His thesis, written under the supervision of Isadore M. Singer, is entitled Conjugate Locus of a Riemannian Manifold. At the University of California, Berkeley, Warner was an assistant professor from 1965 to 1968. At the University of Pennsylvania, he became an associate professor in 1968 and a full professor in 1973. He was from 1995 to 1997 the deputy dean of the University of Pennsylvania School of Arts and Sciences. In 2000, he retired as professor emeritus.

In the 1970s he and Jerry Kazdan, as collaborators, made important contributions to the theory of Riemannian manifolds with prescribed scalar curvature. They proved in 1975 that any smooth function can be realized as a scalar curvature if it becomes negative somewhere on the manifold. Their further research dealt with conjugate points on Riemannian manifolds. 

Warner was a Guggenheim Fellow for the academic year 1976–1977. He was elected in 1994 a Fellow of the American Association for the Advancement of Science.

Selected publications

Articles

Books

References

Pennsylvania State University alumni
Massachusetts Institute of Technology alumni
University of Pennsylvania faculty
Mathematicians at the University of Pennsylvania
Fellows of the American Association for the Advancement of Science
20th-century American mathematicians
21st-century American mathematicians
Differential geometers
1938 births
Living people